Parkgate may refer to:

Places
Parkgate, Cheshire, England, in Neston parish, on the Wirral
Parkgate, County Antrim, Northern Ireland
Parkgate, Cumbria, England; see List of United Kingdom locations: Par-Pay
Parkgate, Dumfries and Galloway, Scotland
Parkgate, Over Peover, Cheshire East, England; see List of United Kingdom locations: Par-Pay
Parkgate, South Yorkshire, England
Park Gate, locality in the borough of Fareham in Hampshire, England

Others
Parkgate F.C., Rotherham, South Yorkshire, England
Parkgate Junior School, Watford, England
, a Turnbull, Scott & Co cargo ship